Icelus may refer to:

 Icelus or Icelos, another name for Phobetor, in Ovid's Metamorphoses
 Icelus (genus), a genus of fishes
 Icelus, a freedman who served the Roman Emperor Galba before his downfall
 A character in Saint Seiya: The Lost Canvas

See also
 Erynnis icelus, (dreamy duskywing), a butterfly